Lynn Ellen Skrifvars (born February 8, 1951), also known by her married name Lynn Nelson, is an American former competition swimmer who won a gold medal in the  freestyle at the 1971 Pan American Games. Next year she swam for the gold medal-winning U.S.  team at the 1972 Olympics, but did not receive a medal because she did not swim in the final. Individually, she competed in the preliminary heats of the 200-meter backstroke.

Skrifvars earned a degree in physical therapy from the California State University, Long Beach and later worked as a physiotherapist. She also competed in masters swimming events.

References

1951 births
Living people
American female backstroke swimmers
American female freestyle swimmers
Olympic swimmers of the United States
Pan American Games gold medalists for the United States
People from Lynwood, California
Swimmers at the 1971 Pan American Games
Swimmers at the 1972 Summer Olympics
Pan American Games medalists in swimming
Universiade medalists in swimming
Universiade silver medalists for the United States
Medalists at the 1970 Summer Universiade
Medalists at the 1971 Pan American Games
21st-century American women